Pag may refer to:
 Pag, Iranshahr
 Pag, Nik Shahr